Thomas Foley, 1st Baron Foley may refer to:

 Thomas Foley, 1st Baron Foley (1673–1733), first baron of the first creation
 Thomas Foley, 1st Baron Foley (1716–1777), first baron of the second creation

See also
Thomas Foley (disambiguation)